Diary of a Wimpy Kid: Dog Days is a 2012 American comedy film directed by David Bowers from a screenplay by Wallace Wolodarsky and Maya Forbes. It stars Zachary Gordon and Steve Zahn. Robert Capron, Devon Bostick, Rachael Harris, Peyton List, Grayson Russell, and Karan Brar also have prominent roles. It is the third installment in the Diary of a Wimpy Kid film series. It was released by 20th Century Fox on August 3, and it earned $77.1 million against a $22 million production budget.

The film is based on the third and fourth books of the Diary of a Wimpy Kid book series, The Last Straw and Dog Days, respectively. The "Holly Hills"  and "Spag Union" portions of the film are featured in the third book, while much of the rest is based on the fourth book.

The film is also the last one in the series to feature the original cast members, as many of the cast (such as Zachary Gordon, Robert Capron and Devon Bostick) outgrew their roles and new actors were cast for the next installment Diary of a Wimpy Kid: The Long Haul, which was released on May 19, 2017.

Plot
 
After Greg and Rodrick develop a brotherly bond, their family visits the local pool, where they run into Lenwood Heath, a reformed delinquent friend of Rodrick's who works as a lifeguard. Heath attends Spag Union, a military school that begins at the eighth grade. Frank notes that Greg is about to enter eighth grade and considers signing him up.

After learning that Greg spent his entire first day of summer vacation playing video games, Frank unplugs the family's television set. Susan starts a book club for Greg and his friends and urges Frank to spend more time with him. Frank takes him fishing and to a Civil War reenactment, but his incompetence annoys Frank.

Rowley invites Greg to the local country club. Initially reluctant, he joins Rowley as a guest after learning that his crush, Holly Hills, teaches tennis there. Frank surprises Greg with an unpaid summer internship at his office, hoping they can bond. Disliking the idea, Greg lies about getting a job at the country club, to Frank and Susan's delight. Frank and Susan give Greg a starter cell phone that only allows him to call home or 911.

Rowley invites Greg on a family trip to a rented beach house near the boardwalk, and they ride a ride called the Cranium Shaker that Rodrick suggested, despite Rowley's parents forbidding them from going on "scary rides". Greg becomes increasingly uneasy with the Jeffersons' eccentric lifestyle and secretly uses Rowley's father Robert's laptop computer to email Susan to get himself out of the trip. The Jeffersons confront him after he accidentally sends the email to everyone on Robert's contact list. He desperately tries to call home using his phone but inadvertently calls 911, leading to Robert almost getting arrested for coming to the door with a knife in his hand. Greg is sent home early, and Frank starts to believe that Rowley is a bad influence.

A few days later, Rowley informs Greg that he is no longer allowed to invite him to the country club, but he sneaks in by impersonating members. After Rodrick learns that Holly's sister, Heather, whom he has a crush on, also works at the club, he asks Greg to help him sneak in. Greg reconciles with Rowley and gets Löded Diper a gig for Heather's upcoming sweet sixteen, to Rodrick's delight. During another country club visit, Robert confronts Frank and Greg over Greg's purchase of two hundred and sixty dollars worth of smoothies. Frank mentions that Greg has a "job" there, but the manager denies this. Learning the truth of Greg's deception, Frank expresses his disappointment with him. Shortly after, Rodrick reveals to him that a Spag Union disc has been mailed to them, to his horror.

Rodrick urges Greg to go on the "Wilderness Weekend" camping trip with his classmates to impress Frank. During it, Fregley tells a scary story. Spooked, Greg strikes Frank's hand with a mallet. Greg admits his guilt over constantly messing up. The next day, after overhearing Frank's boss, Stan Warren, insult him over his lack of camping skills, Greg sets a trap with his friends and sneaks into Stan's tent, where he learns that their troop has been cheating by using household appliances and eating precooked meals. Stan discovers Greg and insults him, but Frank chastises Stan for faking his camping skills. He runs into Greg's trap, humiliating himself. At a motel, Frank confesses he never liked camping and decides not to send Greg to Spag Union, to his surprise and delight. He also talks to him about learning from mistakes and taking responsibility, making them both realize they are more alike than they thought.

At Heather's party a few days later, Löded Diper performs a hard rock cover of "Baby" with Rodrick on lead vocals to try to impress her. The performance goes awry when he accidentally knocks over a huge ice bust of her. She attempts to assault him with a microphone stand but smashes a chocolate fountain with it, ending the party in disaster. Holly and Greg still become a couple and spend the rest of their summer together with Rowley.

Cast

Jeff Kinney, the author of the series, reprises his role from the previous film as Holly's and Heather's father.

Production
The film was produced on a budget of $22 million. Principal photography began on August 8, 2011, in Vancouver and was completed on October 7, 2011. The location for the country club pool was the Eagle Ridge Pool in Coquitlam, British Columbia. Filming there took place during the end of August 2011. The municipal pool scenes at the beginning and the end of the movie were filmed at Steveston Pool in Richmond, BC. Filming occurred there during the beginning of September 2011. The Chinese Bunkhouse at the Steveston Shipyards in Richmond was the location of the Wilderness Explorers cabin for Troop 133. During filming, stars Zachary Gordon and Robert Capron, were seen riding the Corkscrew at Playland at Vancouver's fair, the PNE. Capron had to wear a wig for the film, as his hair was shaved to play the role of Young Curly in The Three Stooges, as explained in The Wimpy Kid Movie Diary book. A poster was leaked in March 2012. A teaser trailer was attached to The Three Stooges. An advance screening for the film was held on July 31, 2012.

Release
The film was released in U.S. theaters August 3, 2012

The film was released on iTunes on December 4, 2012 and on DVD and Blu-ray in the United States on December 18, 2012.

An animated short film set after the events of the film, Diary of a Wimpy Kid: Class Clown, was released on the home media release of it, with Zachary Gordon reprising his role as Greg Heffley, and audio of various other cast members from the film covering it.

Reception

Box office

The film grossed $49,008,662 in the U.S. and Canada, and $28,221,033 in other territories, for a total gross of $77,229,695.

The film grossed $14,623,599 in its opening weekend in 3,391 theaters. It later expanded to 3,401 theaters in its second weekend, where it grossed $8,002,166.

Critical response
  Audiences polled by CinemaScore gave the film an average grade of "A−" on an A+ to F scale, the same grade as the two previous films.

Abby West of Entertainment Weekly gave the film a B+ and wrote "Though often self-centered and conniving, Greg remains a likable kid, and the movie entertains by pulling off over-the-top scenarios that set up digestible life lessons for youngsters." OregonLive.com praised Zachary Gordon's acting, writing, "[h]is easy likeability and general relatability are perhaps two of the biggest keys to Diary of a Wimpy Kid: Dog Days."

Matt Mueller of OnMilwaukee gave the film a negative review, calling it "manic, forced, predictable, scatterbrained and often times unpleasant." He criticized its "overstuffed screenplay" for being "very attention-deficit, cramming in numerous wacky plot elements, most of them solely existing for predictable jokes that were met in my screening with interminable silence." He wrote that "[s]ome of the storylines could've made for decent movies on their own," particularly the one where Greg joins the Boy Scouts, but that they were only brought back "when the screenplay needs another forced comic set piece or ill-fated attempt at wringing unearned emotion." He disliked Greg's behavior, writing "He's lazy and wildly selfish, taking advantage of his friend's unbridled kindness. His trip with the Jeffersons ends with Greg insulting the entire family and getting Robert arrested by the police. Later in the film, he runs up their bill sneaking into the country club. What part of this behavior is charming?" The review concludes with Mueller writing, "In Dog Days lone earnest moment, Rowley astutely explains that his parents' disappointment is worse than their yelling. In that case, I'm not angry that a movie like this can take the joys of childhood and make them so joyless and unpleasant. I'm disappointed."

Accolades

Future

Standalone sequel

At the time of its release, the film was described as the last live-action one in the franchise. In August 2012, while doing press for the film, Jeff Kinney, Zachary Gordon, and Robert Capron each indicated that there were no plans for a fourth one, but did not dismiss the possibility entirely. Kinney replied to inquiries regarding the possibility of another sequel, stating, "At present, we don’t have a fourth film in development, but you never know!"

And when describing the likelihood of starring in another film in the series, Gordon explained, "[Dog Days] most likely will be the last movie. The main problem is [the cast is] getting older. You can't stop it. There's no way to temporarily stop us from changing and growing up. You know, that's the problem because the characters are supposed to be timeless." In March 2013, he stated in a Spreecast live stream that there would not be a fourth live-action film. Jeff Kinney had indicated that instead of doing a live-action film of the sixth novel Cabin Fever, he would like to see it adapted into an animated one, stating in an interview, "I hope that it gets made into an animated movie. I'd really like to see it turn into an animated television special."

On July 29, 2016, it was announced that a new film with a different cast based on the 9th book, The Long Haul, had begun production. It was released on May 19, 2017, to a modest box-office success and a critical low for the franchise.

Animated film series
On December 10, 2020, it was announced on Disney Investors Day that an animated film based on the books would premiere on Disney+ sometime in 2021. It will be another reboot, and will be computer-animated, along with any other future Wimpy Kid movies. The animated film was released on December 3, 2021.

References

External links

 
 
 

2010s English-language films
2010s children's comedy films
20th Century Fox films
American children's comedy films
American sequel films
Dune Entertainment films
Films scored by Edward Shearmur
Films directed by David Bowers
Canadian children's comedy films
Diary of a Wimpy Kid (film series)
Films based on multiple works of a series
American films with live action and animation
2012 comedy films
Films about dogs
Films about dysfunctional families
Films about vacationing
Films shot in Vancouver
2010s American films
2010s Canadian films